Hungary competed at the 2008 Summer Olympics in Beijing, China. The country sent 131 individual competitors (77 men and 54 women) plus the men's and women's water polo teams and the women's handball team (13+13 + 14 athletes, respectively) for a total of 171 athletes taking part in the 2008 Summer Olympics. Hungary's gold medal count of 3 was the lowest in the nation's Summer Olympic history since the 1924 Paris Summer Olympics. Its total medal count of 10 was the lowest since the 1928 Summer Olympics in Amsterdam.

Medalists

| width=78% align=left valign=top |

| width=22% align=left valign=top |

Athletics

Men
Track & road events

Field events

Combined events – Decathlon

Women
Track & road events

Field events

Combined events – Heptathlon

* The athlete who finished in second place, Lyudmila Blonska of the Ukraine, tested positive for a banned substance. Both the A and the B tests were positive, therefore Blonska was stripped of her silver medal, and Farkas moved up a position.

Boxing

Hungary qualified five boxers for the Olympic boxing tournament. Szellő qualified at the World Championships. Varga and Kalucza brought the Hungarian boxing squad up to four by qualifying at the first European qualifying event. Bedák was the fifth and final Hungarian to join the team, at the 2nd European tournament.

Canoeing

Sprint
Men

Women

Qualification Legend: QS = Qualify to semi-final; QF = Qualify directly to final

Cycling

Road

Mountain biking

BMX

Diving 

Women

Fencing 

Men

Women

Gymnastics

Artistic
Men

Women

Handball

Women's tournament

Roster

Group play

Quarterfinal

Semifinal

Bronze medal game

Judo

Men

Women

Modern pentathlon

Rowing 

Men

Qualification Legend: FA=Final A (medal); FB=Final B (non-medal); FC=Final C (non-medal); FD=Final D (non-medal); FE=Final E (non-medal); FF=Final F (non-medal); SA/B=Semifinals A/B; SC/D=Semifinals C/D; SE/F=Semifinals E/F; QF=Quarterfinals; R=Repechage

Sailing 

Men

Women

M = Medal race; EL = Eliminated – did not advance into the medal race; CAN = Race cancelled;

Shooting

Men

Women

Swimming

Men

Women

Table tennis

Tennis

Triathlon

Water polo 

Hungary participated in both the men's and the women's tournaments. The men's team won the gold medal, while the women's team finished in fourth place.

Men's tournament

Roster

Group play

All times are China Standard Time (UTC+8).

Semifinal

Final

Women's tournament

Roster

Group play

All times are China Standard Time (UTC+8).

Semifinals

Bronze medal game

Weightlifting

Wrestling 

Men's freestyle

Men's Greco-Roman

Women's freestyle

See also
 Hungary at the 2008 Summer Paralympics

References

Nations at the 2008 Summer Olympics
2008
Summer Olympics